The consensus 1972 College Basketball All-American team, as determined by aggregating the results of four major All-American teams.  To earn "consensus" status, a player must win honors from a majority of the following teams: the Associated Press, the USBWA, The United Press International and the National Association of Basketball Coaches.

1972 Consensus All-America team

Individual All-America teams

AP Honorable Mention:

Jim Andrews, Kentucky
Marvin Barnes, Providence
Arnie Berman, Brown
Fred Boyd, Oregon State
John Brown, Missouri
Tommy Burleson, NC State
Corky Calhoun, Pennsylvania
Bill Chamberlain, North Carolina
Doug Collins, Illinois State
Kresimir Cosic, Brigham Young
Mel Davis, St. John's
Ernie DiGregorio, Providence
Roy Ebron, Southwestern Louisiana
Mike Edwards, Tennessee
Larry Finch, Memphis State
Ernie Fleming, Jacksonville
Harold Fox, Jacksonville
Richie Garner, Manhattan
John Gianelli, Pacific
Steve Hawes, Washington
Allan Hornyak, Ohio State
Wendell Hudson, Alabama
Kevin Joyce, South Carolina
Greg Kohls, Syracuse
Bob Lackey, Marquette
Russ Lee, Marshall
Allie McGuire, Marquette
Bob Morse, Pennsylvania
Bob Nash, Hawaii
Tom Parker, Kentucky
Hank Siemiontkowski, Villanova
Paul Stovall, Arizona State
Ron Thomas, Louisville
Tracy Tripucka, Lafayette
Kermit Washington, American
John Williamson, New Mexico State
Henry Wilmore, Michigan
Luke Witte, Ohio State
Dennis Wuycik, North Carolina

See also
 1971–72 NCAA University Division men's basketball season

References

NCAA Men's Basketball All-Americans
All-Americans